The National Library Service of Barbados is the government supported public-library service in the nation of Barbados. Headquartered in the capital-city Bridgetown, the main branch was located on Coleridge Street. It was constructed between 1903 and 1906, funded by a grant donated by Scottish-American philanthropist, Andrew Carnegie.

The main branch on Coleridge Street is a coral-stone building, built in the style of the English Renaissance. The library held and preserved in both print and non-print formats an impressive collection of Barbadiana dating back to the 18th century. The library in Bridgetown and other seven branches across the island offer registered membership to all Barbadians and visitors.

The Carnegie Free Library on Coleridge Street was closed in August 2006 for much needed renovations after 100 years of service to Bridgetown and its environs. The Library was moved to a building on Independence Square until such time that renovations could be completed. A National Heritage Task force under the Ministry of Youth, Sports and Culture, charged with raising funds to restore heritage buildings through its non-profit charitable body the Preservation (Barbados) Foundation Trust, is making the restoration of the Library its first project.

The National Library Service is governed under the purview of the Prime Minister's Office.

Hours of operation 
The National Library Service of Barbados, Bridgetown Branch (Independence Sq.) is open Mondays through Saturdays from 9 am to 5 pm. It is closed on Sundays.

See also 
List of national and state libraries

References

External links 
 Official site

 
Barbados, National Library Service of
Libraries established in 1847